Irvin C. "Whiz" Wisniewski  (January 8, 1925 – February 26, 2014) was an American football and basketball player and coach.  He served as the head football coach at Hillsdale College in 1951, tallying a mark of 2–6.  Wisniewski was also the head basketball coach at Hillsdale from 1950 to 1952 and at the University of Delaware from 1954 to 1966, compiling a career college basketball record of 124–179.

Playing career
Wisniewski played football at the University of Michigan as an end from 1946 to 1949.  He caught 11 passes for 126 yards and one touchdown as a senior for the 1949 Wolverines.  He also played basketball at Michigan.

Coaching career
Wisniewski was the head football coach at Hillsdale College in Hillsdale, Michigan for one season, in 1951, tallying a mark of 2–6.

Legacy and honors
Wisniewski and his wife, Martha, owned and operated "Varsity Day Camp" a summer day camp for children located outside of Ann Arbor, Michigan. The camp started in 1950.

Wisniewski was inducted into the Woodward High School, Toledo, OH (Class of 1943) Hall of Fame in 1985. He was inducted into the Delaware Sports Museum and Hall of Fame in 2006.

Death
Wisniewski died at his home in Delaware of a brief illness on February 26, 2014. He was 89 years old.

Head coaching record

Football

References

External links
 

1925 births
2014 deaths
American football ends
Delaware Fightin' Blue Hens football coaches
Delaware Fightin' Blue Hens men's basketball coaches
Hillsdale Chargers football coaches
Hillsdale Chargers men's basketball coaches
Michigan Wolverines football players
Michigan Wolverines men's basketball players
College golf coaches in the United States
People from Monroe County, Michigan
American men's basketball players
Basketball coaches from Michigan
Basketball players from Michigan